Steel River Blues is a British television drama series, created by Patrick Harbinson, that was first broadcast in September 2004 on ITV. Produced by Ken Horn, the series follows the working and private lives of a group of firefighters, known as Blue Watch, who are based in Middlesbrough. Critics were quick to dub the series "Middlesbrough's Burning" or "Teesside's Burning", after the popular fire-fighting drama that preceded it, London's Burning, yet there were very few similarities between the two, apart from them being about the business of firefighting.

Like its predecessor, Steel River Blues was an ensemble drama without any single starring part, though perhaps the best-known actor was Daniel Casey, who was previously a co-star in Midsomer Murders. Other stars included Joanne Farrell, Stuart Graham, Daniel Ainsleigh and Satnam Bhogal. The series title music was an original composition performed by Middlesbrough-born singer-songwriter Chris Rea. It was announced in January 2005 that the series would not be recommissioned due to low viewing figures. Subsequently, the series has never been released on DVD.

Cast
 Daniel Ainsleigh — Firefighter Jeremy Lloyd
 Satnam Bhogal — Firefighter Sunil Gupta
 Mark Cameron — Firefighter Roger Hibbot
 Daniel Casey — Leading Firefighter Tony Barnes
 Charles Dale — Firefighter George Barnes
 Joanne Farrell — Firefighter Nicky Higgins
 Nitin Kundra — Firefighter Asif Hussain
 Michael Nardone — Firefighter Dave Tanner
 Daniel Ryan — Firefighter Andy Coulson
 Kelly Wenham — Probationary Firefighter Julie Priestley
 John Bowler — Divisional Commander Mick Hammond
 Stuart Graham — Station Officer Bill McGlinchy
 Steven Hillman — Sub Officer Alan Priestley
 Clare Buckfield — LCRO Katy Bell
 Victoria Hawkins — CRO Sandra Harris
 Sarah Preston – Belinda Moss

Episodes

See also
The Smoke
Chicago Fire
Rescue Me

References

External links

2004 British television series debuts
2004 British television series endings
2000s British drama television series
ITV television dramas
2000s British television miniseries
Television series by ITV Studios
Television series by Yorkshire Television
English-language television shows
Middlesbrough
Television shows set in Yorkshire
Television shows set in County Durham
Television series about firefighting